Chrau (also known as Jro, Ro, Tamun, Charuo, Choro, Chíoro)  is a Bahnaric language spoken by some of the 22,000 ethnic Cho Ro people in southern Vietnam. Unlike most languages of Southeast Asia, Chrau has no lexical tone, though it does have significant sentence intonation.

There are fewer than 20,000 native speakers of Chrau. Most people who speak Chrau are from the Southern parts of Vietnam such as Bien Hoa and Binh Tuy.

The language of Chrau has much Chinese influence, explaining its similarity to many other languages. In the later years after they began to sell crops to others in the area, the influence of Vietnamese would begin to appear in their language. Similarly to the Chinese and Vietnamese language, there are also certain tones in the Chrau language that are emphasized when speaking.

Classification
The Chrau language is part of the South Bahnaric subgroup along with Kơho, Stiêng and the Mnon dialects. Many see Kơho and Chrau as an independent subgroup but there is not much on that, however the distinction between the two is seen to be obvious. Since it is of Bahnaric origin, there are many cognates with other divisions in this group such as Jarai and Radê. There is also seen to be many influences from other Southeast Asian countries other than Vietnam like Laos and Cambodia as well as Malaysia.

History
Many suspect the Chrau people were among the first inhabitants of now South Vietnam, however there has been some suspicion that some of the people may have been aboriginals. Before the Vietnamese had inhabited the country, the country was divided between the Malayo-Polynesian and Mon-Khmer speakers. With the Malayo-Polynesian people settling along the inland and high plateaus of Vietnam and the Mon-Khmer people living either North or South of the plateau. Although there is a gap in history between the two areas, many suspect that there could have been a Mon-Khmer invasion to the Malayo-Polynesian. Explaining why the Mon-Khmer language was more prevalent in Southern Vietnam. This has also sparked different stories by different groups of how the Chrau came about be it form the Cambodians of Chamic people.

There are changes happening due to the war forced resettlement of the Chrau, the Jro clan was one of the largest clans of the Chrau people which is why the language is sometimes referred to as Jro. As the Vietnamese began to settle in the area, the Chrau language slowly transformed into Vietnamese, which is why Chrau became an endangered language.

The Chrau language has become something that is exclusively spoken to with other people who know the language. In different situations, Vietnamese is what is typically being used in the markets and not much of the newer generation will not have known what Chrau is.

Geographic distribution
Chrau is currently homogeneous because of the surround clans. Being spoken in the South Vietnam in an area 50 miles from the east of Saigon. Chrau people are known to stretch from the Langa River to the east of Tánhlinh, dividing the east of Chrau and west of Rơgali (another language being spoken). Most of the Chrau language is spoken along the seacoast from Hàmtân to Vũngtàu and Longthành but not farther than the Đồngnai River. Though there are no official cities that have Chrau as an official language, many areas around the Phướctuy and Biênhòa cities there are many who still speak the language there. Though Vietnamese is the major language in all areas.

Many of the people who do speak Chrau tend to lived in areas between the flat lands near the Mekong delta but also near mountainous areas of Vietnam. However, there seems to have been a shift if recent years to the highway areas of Vietnam because of the change in weather which makes traveling difficult for the Chrau people as well as financial stability.

Dialects

Jro 
There is the Jro dialect which is spoken by the majority of the people who do know Chrau because they were the largest clan that existed at the time. It is spoken around the area of  

The dialect separates "n" from "h" as well as saying "ư" is essentially a neutralization of "ĭ" and "ŭ" in certain environments. While "ĕ/ă" and "â/ŏ" neutralize in other environments. Allowing the open syllables to take only long vowels.

Prâng 
This dialect is spoken in locations such as the Túctrung area, but many consider this dialect to be childish and a general mutual intelligibility in context. Although this is not the most popular dialect, there are a few records that are in this dialect. 

Even though there does not seem to be much correlation, it is due to the environment in which the Chrau were in, where they found themselves attempting to mix the two influences of Chinese as well as Vietnamese since the Prâng dialect was more to the west side of Vietnam where it bordered along Laos and Cambodia.

Sounds and phonology
In Chrau there is only one main syllable that is stressed and may sometimes contain unstressed syllables that are considered presyllables. Usually the nouns, verbs, adjectives and such are either monosyllabic or disyllabic. While other parts such as connectives and verbal auxiliaries take are monosyllabic.

Presyllables in Chrau consist of a single initial consonant followed by a single neutral vowel while the main syllable has up to three consonants following a complex vowel in the end.

This results in a nasally sounding consonant followed by voiced stops or voiceless stops. A voiced stop is seen as a stop in the consonant which has more to do with the throat and vibrations in the vocal cords rather than an actual stop in speech.

Chrau is seen to be spoken in pitches much higher due to the nasal sounds as well as at a quicker pace because of the voiceless stops as well as the stressed and unstressed syllables.

Grammar

Morphology
Chrau has a major influence of monosyllables from the trend in eastern and southeastern Asia so there is little left that are some of the original words of Chrau. This can also be seen through the Mon-Khmer language.

Within the Chrau language there has been an evolution of  reduplication. This can be seen with words that have similar spelling that describes an action.

Syntax
Many find Chrau to be moving to a language that is a tonal language, which is based on the emphasis given to each letter in the word. Similarly to Vietnamese and Chinese. There also seems to be a tendency to where Chrau would weaken certain verbs in order to let them have more than one use like an adverb or a preposition. When it comes to pronouns and other nouns there is only a slight difference syntactically.

Vocabulary

Since the Chrau is in Southern Vietnam, there has been influences from all ends such as the markets and roads that are being built. Although many words of the Chrau had originated as their own word, as the Vietnamese and Chinese influence began to seep in, their words became morph into something that was a combination of both languages. However, only the Chrau seemed to have understood the language that has formed. It is also noted that not all their words have been influenced by the Vietnamese, rather just a few.

Writing system

The writing system tends to be more formal since it is neither a traditional culture or intimate conversation. There is a colloquial style that is used in ordinary conversation which is marked by short sentences and frequent ellipsis.

Examples

Numbering System 

The numbering system is one example of the difference in the Chrau language to other languages, that even though there is a bit of Chamic and Mon-Khmer influence as well as others. It still has its own unique numbering system, that is only for it.

References

Further reading
 Cheeseman, Nathaniel; Herington, Jennifer; Sidwell, Paul (2013). 'Bahnaric linguistic bibliography with selected annotations. Mon-Khmer Studies vol. 42 Mahidol University and SIL International.
 Một, L. (1971). Vơn Gưt Sinlơ Sŭng Vri Heq. Retrieved from https://www.sil.org/resources/archives/30760

External links
Resources in and about the Chrau language
Chrau Parlametrics I 
Chrau Parlametrics II

Bahnaric languages
Languages of Vietnam